Michael Fink (born 1 February 1982) is a German football manager and player who most recently managed Waldhof Mannheim. He is the chief scout of FC Gießen.

Career
Born in Waiblingen, Fink played from 1992 for VfB Stuttgart, in the beginning for the youth team, later in the reserve in the Regionalliga. In 2004, Arminia Bielefeld signed him for their Bundesliga campaign.

Eintracht Frankfurt
Fink left Arminia Bielefeld after the 2005–06 season to join Eintracht Frankfurt.

In January 2008, he scored a bicycle kick goal in a friendly against Paderborn that won the Goal of the month award.

On 29 November 2008, there were reports linking Fink with a return to Stuttgart in the press.

Eintracht Frankfurt press officer Carsten Knoop confirmed that Fink would be leaving at the end of the season.

Beşiktaş
Fink joined Turkish side Beşiktaş for €1.2 million transfer fee on a three-year contract.

Fink had his pro-competitive match debut in the Super Cup, in which Beşiktaş had lost 2–0 against Fenerbahçe. Fink played a full 90 minutes in a 1–0 away victory at Manchester United.

He scored his second goal against Fenerbahçe and this goal is opted for the best goal of the first part of 2009–10 season by his teammates. He scored his first goal for Beşiktaş at his "league debut" match against İstanbul BB on 7 August 2009, it was also the season's first goal at Süper Lig.

Borussia Mönchengladbach
Fink returned to Germany on loan to Borussia Mönchengladbach in the Bundesliga.

After retirement
In late January 2018, Fink was appointed as the chief scout of FC Gießen.

References

External links
 
 Michael Fink at eintracht-archiv.de 
 

1982 births
Living people
People from Waiblingen
Sportspeople from Stuttgart (region)
German footballers
Footballers from Baden-Württemberg
Association football midfielders
Germany youth international footballers
VfB Stuttgart II players
Arminia Bielefeld players
Eintracht Frankfurt players
Beşiktaş J.K. footballers
Borussia Mönchengladbach players
FC Erzgebirge Aue players
SV Waldhof Mannheim players
Bundesliga players
2. Bundesliga players
Regionalliga players
Süper Lig players
German expatriate footballers
German expatriate sportspeople in Turkey
Expatriate footballers in Turkey